Nilphamari (Nilphamari Jela also Nilphamari Zila) is a district in Northern Bangladesh. It is a part of the Rangpur Division. It is about 400 kilometers to the northwest of the capital Dhaka. Nilphamari is bounded by Rangpur and Lalmonirhat in east, Rangpur and Dinajpur in south, Dinajpur and Panchagarh in west, Cooch Behar of India in north. There are many rivers in Nilphamari including the Tista, Buritista, Isamoti, Jamuneshwari, Dhum, Kumlai, Charalkata, Sorbomongola, Salki, Chikli, Chara and Deonai. There are four Municipal Corporation in Nilphamari district. Area of these Municipalities are Nilphamari 42.70 SqKm(27.50 SqKm Present, 15.20 SqKm Ongoing), Saidpur-34.42 SqKm, Jaldhaka-28.22 SqKm and Domar-9.421 SqKm. There are 60(sixty) Unions, 370 Moujas and 378 Village in Nilphamari district.

Etymology
About 200 years ago, the British established farms for cultivating indigo (nil). The soil of this area was very fertile for indigo cultivation. It is widely believed that the term "" was derived from "" by the local farmers. And then the word "Nilphamari" was derived from "Nil khamari".

History
Nilphamari was previously under the Rajshahi division. The Nilphamari subdivision was established in 1875. It was a subdivision of the Rangpur District. It was turned into a district in 1984. The district consists of 6 upazilas, 4 municipalities, 60 union , 370  and 378 villages.

Historical specialty 
The historical Tebhaga movement spread over Domar and Dimla of this district in the 1940s. Indigo used to be cultivated extensively in this district. Saidpur is best known for its railway workshop. In 1870, the Assam-Bengal railway set up its largest workshop in Saidpur and many Biharis or Urdu-speakers came to work there. During the British rule the telephone exchange for the whole Assam-Bengal District was also situated in Saidpur, and it was the third-largest city of Bangladesh after Dhaka and Chittagong. Saidpur had the first airport in North Bengal. There was also a cantonment during the British period.

Administration

Source: Bangladesh Bureau of Statistics (Census 2011).

Deputy Commissioner (DC): Pankaj Ghosh (6 December 2022 - Present)

Demographics

According to the 2011 Bangladesh census, Nilphamari District had a population of 1,834,231, of which 922,964 were males and 911,267 females. Rural population was 1,544,257 (84.19%) while the urban population was 289,974 (15.81%). Nilphamari district had a literacy rate of 44.37% for the population 7 years and above: 47.59% for males and 41.60% for females.

Muslims make up 83.90% while Hindus are 15.99% of the population. The local dialect is Rangpuri.

Economy
Nilphamari is the main industrial centre of Rangpur Division. Apart from Uttara EPZ, Many Government and private industry situated here. Electricity has reached to almost every households. As of 2021, 100% people of this district get electricity. There are two(Jaldhaka and Saidpur) 132/33 KV Power Grid (National Power Grid-PGCB) Substation situated in Nilphamari. There is also a power plant in Saidpur of Nilphamari supplying 20 MW to National Power Grid-PGCB. Nilphamari Palli Bidyut Samity, a subsidiary of the people of Nilphamari supplies power to rural areas of the district. NESCO, a subsidiary company of BPDB, supplies power in urban areas and Bazars. Nilphamari has an agriculture-based economy. Nilphamari produces rice, wheat, potato, tobacco, and many seasonal crops. The major occupation of the people is farming. Among the working population 45.28% are farmers, 27.81% are farm laborer's, 3.42% are daily workers, 8.65% are businessmen, 6.07% are government and non-government employers, 8.77% have other occupations.

Places of interest

 Nilsagar Nilphamari: Nilsagar a historical dighi (big pond) which stands at Dhobadanga mauza of Gorgram union about 14 km southwest of Nilphamari district headquarters. During the reign of Raja Birat, there were many cow farms at Gorgram. Raja Birat dug a large dighi named Birat Dighi or Birna Dighi or Binna Dighi for the cows. After the independence of Bangladesh, the dighi was renamed as Nilsagar. A Hindu  stands on the east bank and an abode of a Muslim  on the west bank of the dighi. The area of the dighi is 21.449 ha and depth ranges from 7m to 12m. The entire dighi is surrounded by brick walls. The main decorated ghat of the dighi was made by Raja Birat. Every year the banks of the dighi are used as a village fair site especially during the Baruni Snan festival of the full moon in the month of Baisakh. The Harikirtan singers usually play music during the fair, with many kinds of kirtan songs. Every year many tourists and various kinds of migratory birds come here. It is well known as a recreation zone and a picnic spot.
 The palace of Raja Harish Chandra (ninth century)
 Garh (Fort) of Raja Dharmapal and his palace (eighteenth century)
 Three domed Jami Mosque at Bherbheri (eighteenth century)
 Tomb of Hazrat Pir Mohiuddin (Kundupukur)
 Dimla Rajbari
 Saidpur Airport
 Railway Workshop in Saidpur
 Uttara Export Processing Zone
 Teesta Barrage
 Saidpur Church (1893)
 Nat Settlement (prison, 1871)
 Leprosy Hospital
 Chini Mosque

Education
The literacy rate of Nilphamari is 49.69% according to the 2011 Bangladesh census. There are 940 primary schools, 295 high schools, 95 colleges, 1 medical college, 2 government and 17 non-government technical institutes, 1 Primary Teachers Training Institute, 115 Dakhil Madrasas, 24 Alim Madrasas, 14 Fazil Madrasas and one Kamil Madrasa in Nilphamari.

The noted educational institutions in the district are:
 Nilphamari Medical College
 Nilphamari Govt. College, Nilphamari
 Bangladesh Army University of Science and Technology, Saidpur, Nilphamari
 Nilphamari Government Mohila College
 Nilphamari Government High School
 Nilphamari Government Girls' School
 Nilphamari Technical School and College
 Nilphamari Teachers Training College
 Collectorate Public School & College, Nilphamari
 Nilphamari Model College, Nilphamari
 Saidpur Science School & College, Nilphamari
 Saidpur Cant Public School & College, Nilphamari
 Domar Government College
 Domar ML High School
 Domar Women College
 Domar Government Girls' School
 Domar Balika Nikaton School
 Domar Shohid Smrity Government Primary School
 Saidpur College
 Sonaray High School
 Sonaray Dristi Nondon Govt. Primary School
 Chhitmirganj Shalongram Fazil Madrasah

Place to visit

Nilsagar
Nilsagar a famous historical dighi (big pond) that stands at Dhobadanga mauza of Gorgram union about 14 km southwest of Nilphamari district headquarters. During the reign of Raja Birat there were many cow farms at Gorgram. Raja Birat dug a large dighi named as Birat Dighi or Birna Dighi or Binna Dighi for the cows. After the independence of Bangladesh, the dighi was renamed as Nilsagar. A Hindu mandir stands on the east bank and an abode of a Muslim darvesh on the west bank of the dighi. The area of the dighi is 21.449 ha and depth ranges from 7m to 12m. The entire dighi is surrounded by brick walls. The main decorated ghat of the dighi was made by Raja Birat. Every year the banks of the dighi are used as a village fair site especially during the occasion of Baruni Snan festival in the full moon of the month of Baisakh. Usually, in the fair the Harikirtan singers play music with many kinds of kirtan songs. Every year many tourists and various kinds of migratory birds come here. It is well known as a recreation zone and a picnic spot.

Transportation
Nilphamari district is connected with Dhaka by bus, train and air. Trains available in Nilphamari are Nilsagar Express (Dhaka), Barendro Express (Rajshahi), Titumir Express (Rajshahi), Rupsha Express (Khulna) and Simanto Express (Khulna). Major bus services are Greenline, Nabil, Shyamoli, Hanif, S.A. Travels, and BRTC. There is an airport at Saidpur, about 20 km from Nilphamari district town.

Notable people
 Advocate Dabir Uddin Ahmed, language movement activist in 1952
 Khairat Hosen, M.L.A., Minister of Food, Fisheries, and Livestock of Pakistan from 1955 to 1957
 Mashiur Rahman, also known as Jadu Mia, former Senior Minister of Bangladesh
 Shafiqul Ghani Swapan, politician and ex-minister  
 Abdur Rauf, politician & former chief whip
 Ahsan Ahmed, Member of Parliament
 Asaduzzaman Noor, actor and politician
 Rathindranath Roy, folk singer
 Anisul Hoque, journalist, writer and editor
 Baby Naznin, singer

Notes

References

 
Districts of Bangladesh